Tetrasodium pyrophosphate, also called sodium pyrophosphate, tetrasodium phosphate or TSPP, is an inorganic compound with the formula Na4P2O7. As a salt, it is a white, water-soluble solid. It is composed of pyrophosphate anion and sodium ions. Toxicity is approximately twice that of table salt when ingested orally. Also known is the decahydrate Na4P2O710(H2O).

Use
Tetrasodium pyrophosphate is used as a buffering agent, an emulsifier, a dispersing agent, and a thickening agent, and is often used as a food additive. Common foods containing tetrasodium pyrophosphate include chicken nuggets, marshmallows, pudding, crab meat, imitation crab, canned tuna, and soy-based meat alternatives and cat foods and cat treats where it is used as a palatability enhancer. 

In toothpaste and dental floss, tetrasodium pyrophosphate acts as a tartar control agent, serving to remove calcium and magnesium from saliva and thus preventing them from being deposited on teeth. Tetrasodium pyrophosphate is used in commercial dental rinses before brushing to aid in plaque reduction.

Tetrasodium pyrophosphate is sometimes used in household detergents to prevent similar deposition on clothing, but due to its phosphate content it causes eutrophication of water, promoting algae growth.

Production
Tetrasodium pyrophosphate is produced by the reaction of furnace-grade phosphoric acid with sodium carbonate to form disodium phosphate, which is then heated to 450 °C to form tetrasodium pyrophosphate:
2 Na2HPO4  →  Na4P2O7  +  H2O

References

Sodium compounds
Pyrophosphates
Food additives
Edible thickening agents